is a Japanese anime series. It premiered on 9 September 2012.

Plot

Character

 Hero

Media

Anime

Music

Manga

References

External links
Official website at Sunrise 
Official website at Nagoya TV 

2012 anime television series debuts
Sunrise (company)
Card games in anime and manga